Jesus Henry Christ is a 2011 American comedy film based on Dennis Lee's student short film of the same name. It was released on April 20, 2012. The film was directed by Lee, who also penned the screenplay. The film was produced by Joseph Boccia, Sukee Chew, Lisa Roberts Gillan, Deepak Nayar, Julia Roberts, Philip Rose, and Katie Wells. The film stars Jason Spevack, Toni Collette, Michael Sheen, Samantha Weinstein, Frank Moore, Mark Caven, and Paul Braunstein.

Plot
Henry (Jason Spevack) is a precocious 13-year old boy, conceived in a petri-dish and raised by his single mother, Patricia (Toni Collette), and is smarter than all of his peers. However, the one question he can't answer is, who is his father? Henry's attempts at locating his father led him to Dr. Slavkin O'Hara (Michael Sheen), a university professor who has decided to raise his daughter, Audrey (Samantha Weinstein), as a psychology experiment in a world free of gender bias. Patricia starts fearing that she's losing her son, Audrey wishes she didn't have a father, Dr. O'Hara has no idea how to keep his daughter happy, and Henry may just have found the family he was looking for.

Cast
 Jason Spevack as Henry James Herman
 Toni Collette as Patricia Herman
 Michael Sheen as Dr. Slavkin O'Hara
 Samantha Weinstein as Audrey O'Hara
 Frank Moore as Stan Herman
 Austin MacDonald as Brian the Bully
 Cameron Kennedy as Jimmy Herman
 Mark Caven as President Sullivan
 Paul Braunstein as Dr. Gunther Flowers
 Mark MacDonald as Tim Herman
 Mickey MacDonald as Tom Herman
 Hannah Bridgen as Young Patricia Herman
 Jamie Johnston as Young Billy Herman

Release
The film had its world premiere in April 2011 at the Tribeca Film Festival before going on general release in the US on April 20, 2012. It grossed $20,183 at the box office.

Reception
, the film holds a 23% approval rating on Rotten Tomatoes, based on 22 reviews with an average rating of 4.06 out of 10. On Metacritic it has a score of 41% based on reviews from 12 critics, indicating "mixed or average reviews".

John Anderson of Variety magazine says the film is "Too deliberately eccentric" but that it "does feature some standout performances and a refreshingly unconventional approach to telling its slight story."

Accolades

Reference list

External links
 
 Jesus Henry Christ on Rotten Tomatoes

Films shot in Toronto
Films shot in Hamilton, Ontario
American black comedy films
2011 films
American pregnancy films
Features based on short films
2010s English-language films
2010s American films